David Keith Lynch (born January 20, 1946) is an American filmmaker, painter, television director, visual artist, musician and occasional actor. Known for his surrealist films, he has developed his own unique cinematic style, which has been dubbed "Lynchian", and which is characterized by its dream imagery and meticulous sound design. Indeed, the surreal and in many cases violent elements to his films have earned them the reputation that they "disturb, offend or mystify" their audiences.

Lynch's oeuvre encompasses work in both cinema and television. His films include The Elephant Man, Blue Velvet, Wild at Heart, The Straight Story, and perhaps his most critically successful film, 2001's Mulholland Drive; whilst his television debut, Twin Peaks, earned five Emmy Award nominations for its first season.

In the course of his career, Lynch has received multiple awards and nominations. Amongst these are three Academy Award nominations for Best Director, and a nomination for best screenplay. Lynch has twice won France's César Award for Best Foreign Film, as well as the Palme d'Or at the Cannes Film Festival and a Golden Lion award for lifetime achievement at the Venice Film Festival. The French government has awarded him the Legion of Honour, the country's top civilian distinction, honoring him first as a Chevalier in 2002 and then as an Officier in 2009; Lynch has also been awarded the key to the city of Bydgoszcz, Poland. In 2017, Lynch was awarded The Edward MacDowell Medal by The MacDowell Colony for outstanding contributions to American culture.

Films

The Elephant Man
The Elephant Man is a 1980 American drama film based on the true story of Joseph Merrick (called John Merrick in the film), a severely deformed man in 19th century London. The film was directed by Lynch, who wrote the screenplay with Eric Bergren and Christopher De Vore. It stars John Hurt, Anthony Hopkins, Anne Bancroft, John Gielgud, Wendy Hiller, Michael Elphick, Hannah Gordon, and Freddie Jones.

Blue Velvet
Blue Velvet is a 1986 American mystery film written and directed by Lynch. The movie exhibits elements of both film noir and surrealism. The film features Kyle MacLachlan, Isabella Rossellini, Dennis Hopper, and Laura Dern.

Wild at Heart
Wild at Heart is a 1990 American film written and directed by Lynch, and based on Barry Gifford's 1989 novel Wild at Heart. The film star Nicolas Cage, Laura Dern and Diane Ladd; and tells the story of Sailor Ripley and Lula Pace Fortune, a young couple from Cape Fear, North Carolina who go on the run from her domineering mother.

Twin Peaks: Fire Walk with Me
Twin Peaks: Fire Walk with Me is a 1992 American psychological horror film directed by Lynch, who co-wrote the screenplay with Robert Engels. The film stars Sheryl Lee, Moira Kelly, David Bowie, Chris Isaak, Harry Dean Stanton, Ray Wise and Kyle MacLachlan; and can be viewed as both prologue and epilogue to the television series Twin Peaks, created by Lynch and Mark Frost.

The Straight Story
The Straight Story is a 1999 film directed by Lynch. The film was edited and produced by Mary Sweeney, who also co-wrote the script with John E. Roach. The film stars Richard Farnsworth, Sissy Spacek and Harry Dean Stanton. The Straight Story is based on the true story of Alvin Straight's journey across Iowa and Wisconsin on a lawnmower.

Mulholland Drive
Mulholland Drive is a 2001 American neo-noir psychological thriller written and directed by Lynch, starring Justin Theroux, Naomi Watts, and Laura Harring. The film tells the story of an aspiring actress named Betty Elms, newly arrived in Los Angeles, California, who meets and befriends an amnesiac hiding in her aunt's apartment. The story includes several other seemingly unrelated vignettes that eventually connect in various ways, as well as some surreal scenes and images that relate to the cryptic narrative.

{| class="wikitable plainrowheaders" style="font-size: 95%;"
|-
! scope="col"; width=270 | Award
! scope="col"; width=50|Year
! scope="col"; width=300 | Category
! scope="col"; width=300 | Notes
! scope="col"; width=70 | Result
|-
!scope="row"| Academy Awards
| 2002
| Best Director
|
| 
|-
!scope="row"| American Film Institute
| 2002
| Best Director
|
| 
|-
!scope="row"| Bodil Awards
| 2003
| Best American Film
|
| 
|-
!scope="row"| Boston Society of Film Critics
| 2002
| Best Director
|
| 
|-
!scope="row" rowspan=2 | Cannes Film Festival
| rowspan=2 |2001
| Best Director
| Tied with Joel Coen for The Man Who Wasn't There
| 
|-
| Palme d'Or
|
| 
|-
!scope="row"| César Award
| 2002
| Best Foreign Film
|
| 
|-
!scope="row"| Chicago Film Critics Association Awards
| 2002
| Best Director
|
| 
|-
!scope="row" rowspan=2 | Golden Globe Awards
| rowspan=2 | 2002
| Best Director
|
| 
|-
| Best Screenplay
|
| 
|-
!scope="row"| Los Angeles Film Critics Association Awards
| 2002
| Best Director
|
| 
|-
!scope="row"| Toronto Film Critics Association Awards
| 2001
| Best Director
|
| 
|-
|}

Inland EmpireInland Empire is a 2006 mystery film. The film stars Laura Dern, Justin Theroux, Harry Dean Stanton, Grace Zabriskie, Jeremy Irons and Diane Ladd. While remaking a Polish film that was abandoned after a mysterious tragedy, an actress finds herself falling for a fellow cast member and realises that her life is starting to echo the plot of their production.

Television
Twin PeaksTwin Peaks is an American television serial drama created by Lynch and Mark Frost. The series follows the investigation headed by FBI Special Agent Dale Cooper (Kyle MacLachlan), of the murder of a popular teenager and homecoming queen, Laura Palmer (Sheryl Lee). Twin Peaks features a large ensemble cast, including Michael Ontkean, Mädchen Amick, Dana Ashbrook, Richard Beymer, Lara Flynn Boyle, Joan Chen, Eric Da Re, Sherilyn Fenn, Warren Frost, Harry Goaz, Michael Horse, Piper Laurie, Peggy Lipton, James Marshall, Everett McGill, Jack Nance, Kimmy Robertson, Russ Tamblyn, Kenneth Welsh and Ray Wise.

Other film awards

Other accolades
Lynch has also been honored by the French government with induction into the Legion of Honour, first being honored as a Chevalier (knight) in 2002, and again as an Officier'' (officer) in 2009. In 2012, Lynch was presented with the key to the city of Bydgoszcz, Poland, by the city's mayor Rafał Bruski. The presentation was part of that year's Plus Camerimage festival.

Footnotes

References

Awards
Lynch, David, list of awards and nominations received by
Lynch, David, list of awards and nominations received by